Dexter Britain (born 13 July 1989) is an English self-taught pianist, composer, record producer and songwriter. Best known for his standout piece, "The Time To Run (Finale)". He has become noted for his soundtrack composition.

His work has been used more than 11 000 times and features in projects from commercials, and feature films, to charity videos, and weddings. Among his clients are G-Tech, GoPro, World Health Organization, NASA, O2, Jason Silva (Shots of Awe, Future Of Us), TEDx, Kelloggs, Nike, BVLGARI, McLaren, Bentley, National Geographic, UNICEF, Ralph Lauren, Myers Department Store, Nationwide Insurance, Google, O2 Telefonica, LG.

Awards

International Song Writing Competition 
 2016: Charge into 2017 Instrumental Category - 2nd place winner

Discography
During 2012 and 2016, Britain released 22 albums:
 Nothing to Fear - 1 track (2012)
 Utopia - 4 tracks (2012)
 Creative Commons Volume.1 - 14 tracks (2012)
 Music To Sell Cars By - 12 tracks (2012)
 Creative Commons Volume.2 - 12 tracks (2012)
 Same Old Moments - 12 tracks (2012)
 In Space And Time - 12 tracks (2012)
 Creative Commons Volume.3 - 9 tracks (2012)
 Creative Commons Volume.4 - 6 tracks (2012)
 Xmas 2012 - 3 tracks (2012)
 Creative Commons Volume.5 - 12 tracks (2012)
 Creative Commons Volume.6 - 12 tracks (2013)
 Utopia - EP - 4 tracks (2013)
 Solo - 12 tracks (2013)
 Light of Life - 14 tracks (2013)
 Ardor - 5 tracks (2013)
 Zenith - 3 tracks (2013)
 Zenith - Single - 3 tracks (2013)
 The Score - 16 tracks (2014)
 The Best Of Creative Commons - 19 tracks (2014)
 Charge Into 2015 - 1 track (2014)
 Impression - 5 tracks (2015)
 Till We Meet Again (Music from The Motion Picture) - 15 tracks (2015)
 Love Is Love - 1 track (2016)
 Creative Commons Volume.7 - 12 tracks (2016)

Filmography
Credited as a composer 25 times in movies and TV series:
 Bubbles Beat (Documentary short) - 2012
 Stroke of Misfortune (Documentary short) - 2012
 Coder (Short) - 2013
 The Awakening (Short) - 2013
 Prescindibles (Short) - 2013
 Where the Wonder Went (Documentary short) - 2013
 Molinillos (Short) - 2013
 Light Mind (Documentary short) - 2013
 Green Energy Futures (TV Series documentary short) (composer - 2 episodes) - 2013-2014
 I'll Never Hurt You (Short) - 2014
 The Finish Line (Short) - 2014
 Luciérnagas (Short) - 2014
 Whispers of the Ocean (Short) - 2014
 The Trench (Short) - 2014
 Salvage (Short) - 2014
 Captured (Short) - 2015
 Beíth (Short) - 2015
 Whyirun (TV Mini-Series short) - 2015 
 A Housemate (Short) - 2015 
 Neur-O (composer: theme music) - 2015 
 Ética (Short) - 2016 
 Dear (Short) - 2016 
 A Man Called Dad (TV Short documentary) - 2016
 Till We Meet Again - 2016
 Penury's Song - 2016

References

External links
 

1989 births
Living people
People from St Albans
English television composers
English film score composers
English male film score composers
English contemporary pianists
English songwriters
21st-century pianists